Mario Roberto Uriburu Peró was a sailor from Argentina, known as "Bobby, who represented his country at the 1924 Summer Olympics in Le Havre, France.

References

Sources
 
 

Argentine male sailors (sport)
Sailors at the 1924 Summer Olympics – 8 Metre
Olympic sailors of Argentina
1901 births
1964 deaths